Edgars is a Johannesburg-based chain of stores present all over Southern Africa. The department store was previously selling clothing, shoes, homeware & beauty and under new leadership has recently shifted its focus to mass-market fashion and beauty products. 

The chain had just around 200 stores, with multiple locations in South Africa, Namibia, Zambia and Botswana as well as in the capital cities of eSwatini (Swaziland), Lesotho, and Ghana when it was sold to Durban based, private fashion company Retailability in 2020.

History

Edgars was founded in Johannesburg, South Africa in 1929.

As part of Edcon, Edgars was included in an ill-fated buyout by U.S. private equity firm Bain Capital Private Equity LP in 2007, which burdened the parent company with debt just as the economy hit a downturn following the global financial crisis. 

In 2014 Edgars opened at a new 50,000 square meter shopping centre in Nairobi, Kenya. In 2018 Edgars introduced a new, larger 8,000 square meter store in Fourways Mall in Johannesburg, featuring trees, play areas, a coffee shop, “beauty rooms” where customers can get makeovers, and a section that allows customers to print their own text or images on clothing. Edgars promoted the new prototype store design as "a bit like a town square, a multi-sensory, tree-lined central social space".

In January 2020 it announced it would close its 6,000 square meter store in the upscale Rosebank Mall in Johannesburg suburb Rosebank. In September 2020

In June 2020 Edcon put the chain up for sale due to economic difficulties stemming from the COVID-19 pandemic. 7 July 2020 it was announced that Edcon has signed an agreement to sell the chain to Durban-based Retailability, which operates 460 stores across Southern Africa and is the owner of brands Legit, which Edcon had sold to Retailability four years prior, Beaver Canoe, and Style. Retailability acquired 130 of 194 Edgars stores.

In September of the same year, the company under the new leadership announced to be repositioning Edgars as a mass market brand focused on fashion and beauty products, shifting from its previous homeware portfolio.

Corporate affairs

Organizational structure 
Edgars Stores Limited is a separate company operating the businesses in Zimbabwe: Edgars and Jet department stores, as well as Edgars Financial Services and Carousel, its Bulawayo-based manufacturing arm.

In Zimbabwe 
Edgars entered the Southern Rhodesia (now Zimbabwe) market in 1946. It was listed on the Southern Rhodesian Stock Exchange, now the Zimbabwe Stock Exchange in 1974. in 2011 it opened a new store in Joina Centre mall in Harare. A store opened in Kadoma in 2019.

There are four Edgars-branded stores in Harare: ZB Centre, Westgate Shopping Centre, and Sam Levy Village in Borrowdale, Robert Mugabe at Angwa, as well as a store in Masvingo.

References

External link
Official website
"What do future department stores look like? The big question that underpins the new Edgars' Fourways store design", "Retail Design", Design Partnership website

Department stores of South Africa
Retailing in Zimbabwe
Retailing in Ghana
Retailing in Namibia
Economy of Lesotho
Economy of Eswatini
1929 establishments in South Africa